Sylvester Smith may refer to:

 Sylvester C. Smith (1858–1913), U.S. Representative from California
 Sylvester Smith (Latter Day Saints) (1806–1880), early Latter Day Saint leader
 Sylvester Smith (tennis)
 Sylvester Smith Farmstead